Irving Park Cemetery is located at 7777 West Irving Park Road, in Chicago.

Irving Park Cemetery performed its first interment in July 1918. Some of the victims of the 1929 Saint Valentine's Day Massacre are buried at Irving Park Cemetery.

Notable burials
 Kay Armen – (1915–2011), singer and actress
 Carmel Henry Carfora – (1878–1958), bishop of the Old Catholic church
 Fred Goetz – (1897–1934), organized crime figure
 Frank Gusenberg – (1893–1929), organized crime figure
 Peter Gusenberg – (1888–1929), organized crime figure
 Albert Kachellek – (1890–1929), organized crime figure

References

External links
 Official website 

1918 establishments in Illinois
Cemeteries in Chicago